Hypatima particulata is a moth in the family Gelechiidae. It was described by Edward Meyrick in 1913. It is found in Sri Lanka and Java, Indonesia.

The wingspan is 10–12 mm. The forewings are grey, irrorated (sprinkled) with whitish and with a series of small dark fuscous spots along the costa, one before the middle rather larger and elongate. There is an elongate dark fuscous mark on the fold at two-fifths of the wing and a small dark fuscous spot in the disc at three-fourths, as well as some brownish suffusion and irregular dark fuscous irroration towards the apex. The hindwings are dark grey, thinly scaled anteriorly.

References

Hypatima
Taxa named by Edward Meyrick
Moths described in 1913